Harriet McClintock Marshall (August 14, 1840–July 25, 1925) was a conductor on the Underground Railroad whose home in Harrisburg, Pennsylvania served as a stop or safe house for the clandestine network, along with the Wesley Union African Methodist Episcopal Zion Church (AME Zion Church) and other homes in the city. She offered shelter, food, and clothing to people escaping slavery. Her husband Elisha Marshall, a formerly enslaved man and veteran of the American Civil War, was also active in helping people reach freedom, often providing transportation.

They also helped to establish a monument to the Colored Troops, which is located in Lincoln Cemetery in Harrisburg, where she and her husband are interred.

Early life
Born in Harrisburg, Pennsylvania on August 14, 1840, as Harriet McClintock, Harriet McClintock Marshall was a daughter of Henry McClintock and Catherine (Yellets) McClintock, a native of Highspire, Pennsylvania who was born circa 1802 or 1803, who was of German and African American ancestry, and who identified as both "White German" and "Mulatto." Catherine McClintock was also a founder of the Wesley Union African Methodist Episcopal Zion Church. 

The sister of Catherine "Kate" McClintock White, Harriet McClintock Marshall was also the half-sister of Mariah Williams Powell and Elizabeth Williams Kelly, through her mother's first marriage to James Williams.

Marshall attended the German School, and became a teacher. In addition, she was employed as a domestic worker for the Eby family in Harrisburg. Marshall and her mother were active on the Underground Railroad.

Marriage and children
Marshall met Elisha Marshall as he made his way north on the Underground Railroad. They were married in 1864. Their son Rev. Dr. William H. Marshall (1865–1916) was a teacher, principal and an A.M.E. Zion Church pastor. Daughter Harriet "Ella" married Morris H. Layton.

Both Harriet and Elisha worked for the Eby family.

Underground Railroad

She was a member of the Wesley Union African Methodist Episcopal Zion Church, which was a station that offered shelter, food, and clothing to people escaping slavery. She and her husband Elisha Marshall (1838–1903), who freed himself, lived in Harrisburg, Pennsylvania. 

Both Harriet and Elisha were active members of the Underground Railroad. Elisha helped transport people and their house at Calder and Front Street was used as a stopping place before people went to the church at Third and Mulberry Streets. Mary and Dr. William M. Jones were also active in Harrisburg's Underground Railroad. They lived in Tanner's Alley and were also members of the Wesley Union church.

Civil War
During the American Civil War, Elisha Marshall served under the 24th United States Colored Infantry Regiment for the Union Army. He was in Company D of the regiment and was mustered into service on February 15, 1865 at Camp William Penn in Philadelphia. Between May 5th and June 1st they were at Washington, D.C. and, then just outside of the capital, at Camp Casey in Virginia. They guarded Confederate prisoners at Point Lookout, Maryland until July 16. They were then in Roanoke, Virginia, where they distributed supplies and preserved order through September. They went to Richmond, Virginia and mustered out on October 1, 1865. Elisha was promoted to corporal during his service.

A monument to African Americans Civil War veterans, that she helped build, resides in the Lincoln Cemetery in Harrisburg.

Death
She died in Harrisburg, Pennsylvania on July 25, 1925 and is buried at the Lincoln Cemetery in the city's Penbrook section. She was depicted in a mural of notable African Americans from Harrisburg. Cesar Viveros designed the mural on The Jackson House Hotel.

Notes

References

1840 births
1925 deaths
African Methodist Episcopal Zion Church
People from Harrisburg, Pennsylvania
Underground Railroad people
Burials in Pennsylvania